The 2012 Ulster Senior Football Championship was the 124th installment of the annual Ulster Senior Football Championship held under the auspices of the Ulster GAA. It was won by Donegal who defeated Down in the final to retain the title they won the previous year. The winning Donegal team received the Anglo-Celt Cup, and automatically advanced to the quarter-final stage of the 2012 All-Ireland Senior Football Championship. They progressed from there to the semi-final then on to the 2012 All-Ireland Senior Football Championship Final where they claimed the Sam Maguire Cup.

Bracket

Preliminary round

Quarter-finals

Semi-finals

Final

References

External links
Ulster GAA website

2U
Gaelic
Ulster Senior Football Championship